Bexhill railway station serves Bexhill-on-Sea in East Sussex, England. It is on the East Coastway Line, and train services are provided by Southern.

History

Bexhill Station is the third station on this site. The present station was opened in June 1902 and replaced a previous station positioned on both sides of the track across the top of Devonshire Road. The new station had exceptionally long platforms, approximately 960 yards. The station was known as Bexhill Central after July 1923, when the Southern Railway was formed. This was because the former SECR establishment in Terminus Road took was also Bexhill. Bexhill Central reverted to Bexhill sometime after the SECR establishment closed in June 1964.
The previous stations on this site were the first station of 1847 which was sited west of the present down platform. The second station was on the up and down sides across the top of Station Square, now Devonshire Square.

Description
The station is a grade II listed building, and a restoration project to the platform canopies and ticket office area was completed in the summer of 2008.

The station is accredited as part of the Department for Transport's Secure Stations scheme, with a digital CCTV system in place. It is staffed during the daytime but not late in the evenings.

The station has ticket barrier access only, prior to this the station was often unmanned.

Services 
All services at Bexhill are operated by Southern using  EMUs and  DMUs.

The typical off-peak service in trains per hour is:

 1 tph to  via 
 1 tph to 

During the peak hours and on Saturdays, the station is also served by an additional hourly semi-fast service between Brighton and Ore.

Campaigns for service improvements
A local campaign group Bexhill Rail Action Group (BRAG) was formed in 2005 in response to proposals to end through services to London Victoria. The campaign was successful and BRAG continues to campaign for local rail improvements.

Campaigners are seeking to upgrade and electrify the Marshlink Line to extend Southeastern high speed train services (which operate from London St Pancras via High Speed 1 to Ashford International) onwards via Rye to Hastings, Bexhill and Eastbourne, and which, if realised could slash journey times between Bexhill and the capital to around 1 hour and 15 minutes, instead of the average 1 hour 52 minutes currently.

References

External links 

Railway stations in East Sussex
DfT Category E stations
Former London, Brighton and South Coast Railway stations
Railway stations in Great Britain opened in 1846
Railway stations served by Govia Thameslink Railway
1846 establishments in England
Bexhill-on-Sea